Travis Gregg (born March 28, 1978) is an American racing driver from Camden, Ohio.

After karting, Gregg began in cars in amateur SCCA Formula Atlantic in 1998 and 1999 while attending Miami University. He graduated in 2000 and ventured into sprint car racing, competing in a number of series across the midwestern United States. In 2004 he began racing in the Infiniti Pro Series (now called Indy Lights) and sat on pole in his first series race at Kentucky Speedway. He captured his first win from the pole in the first race of the following season at Homestead Miami Speedway and finished 3rd in series points for Sam Schmidt Motorsports, also winning at Kentucky and Texas Motor Speedway. Despite his success in 2005, Gregg did not have a full-time ride in 2006 and participated in 3 races as a substitute driver, a role which he continued to fill in 2007 and 2008, driving in two races in each of those years.

External links
Travis Gregg official website
Career stats at IndyCar.com

1978 births
Living people
Indy Lights drivers
Miami University alumni
People from Camden, Ohio
Racing drivers from Ohio

Arrow McLaren SP drivers
Team Moore Racing drivers